Lelkom is a town in the Boudry Department of Ganzourgou Province in central Burkina Faso. The town has a population of 1,223.

References

External links
Satellite map at Maplandia.com

Populated places in the Plateau-Central Region
Ganzourgou Province